This list of Vogue España cover models is a catalog of cover models who have appeared on the cover of Vogue España, the Spanish edition of Vogue magazine, starting with the magazine's first issue in April 1988.

1980s

1988

1989

1990s

1990

1991

1992

1993

1994

1995

1996

1997

1998

1999

2000s

2000

2001

2002

2003

2004

2005

2006

2007

2008

2009

2010s

2010

2011

2012

2013

2014

2015

2016

2017

2018

2019

2020s

2020

2021

2022

External links
Vogue Spain Official Site
Vogue Spain cover archive

Espana
Vogue
Spanish fashion